Asino is a town and the administrative center of Asinovsky District in Tomsk Oblast, Russia. Population:  It was previously known as Kseniyevsky (until 1930).

History
It was founded in 1896 as the transmigratory settlement of Kseniyevsky; in 1930 the construction of the railway to Tomsk started. The settlement was renamed Asino in 1930 after the railway station, and the town status was granted to it in 1952.

Administrative and municipal status
Within the framework of administrative divisions, Asino serves as the administrative center of Asinovsky District, to which it is directly subordinated. As a municipal division, the town of Asino is incorporated within Asinovsky Municipal District as Asinovskoye Urban Settlement.

Economy
There is a port on the Chulym River and a railway station.

Important economic industries include forestry, wood working, large scale wood shipping, and tractor repair. In addition, the area also has combines (meat and milk) and a flax mill.

Agriculture in Asino in dominated by rye, wheat, flax grasses, and breeding cattle and pigs. Mineral deposits of peat, sand, and clay are found in the vicinity.

References

Notes

Sources

External links
Official website of Asino 
Directory of organizations in Asino 

Cities and towns in Tomsk Oblast
Renamed localities of Tomsk Oblast